Sally Watson House is a historic home located in the Germantown neighborhood of Philadelphia, Pennsylvania. It was designed by architect Wilson Eyre and built in 1886 for Sarah R. ("Sallie") Watson (1844-1918). It is a three-story, rubble schist and shingle dwelling in the Shingle style.  It has a gambrel roof and measures approximately 43-feet square.

It was added to the National Register of Historic Places in 1982.

References

Houses on the National Register of Historic Places in Philadelphia
Shingle Style architecture in Pennsylvania
Houses completed in 1889
Houses in Philadelphia
Germantown, Philadelphia